Frances Liu Fan (born 1 April 1984) is a Singaporean badminton player. Together with Li Li, Xiao Luxi and Rong Muxi, they were Singapore badminton's pioneer batch of foreign talent.

Career 
Liu won Singapore first ever women's badminton team gold at the 2003 Southeast Asian Games that was held in Vietnam's Ho Chi Minh City. She retired from her playing career in 2011 and in 2014, became Singapore national badminton (singles) coach.

Achievements

IBF Grand Prix 
The World Badminton Grand Prix was sanctioned by the International Badminton Federation from 1983 to 2006.

Mixed doubles

BWF International Challenge/Series 
Women's singles

Women's doubles

Mixed doubles

  BWF International Challenge tournament
  BWF International Series tournament

References

External links 
 
 Frances Liu at m2006.thecgf.com

Living people
1984 births
Badminton players from Liaoning
Singaporean female badminton players
Badminton players at the 2006 Asian Games
Asian Games bronze medalists for Singapore
Asian Games medalists in badminton
Medalists at the 2006 Asian Games
Badminton players at the 2006 Commonwealth Games
Commonwealth Games competitors for Singapore
Competitors at the 2003 Southeast Asian Games
Competitors at the 2005 Southeast Asian Games
Competitors at the 2007 Southeast Asian Games
Competitors at the 2009 Southeast Asian Games
Southeast Asian Games gold medalists for Singapore
Southeast Asian Games silver medalists for Singapore
Southeast Asian Games bronze medalists for Singapore
Southeast Asian Games medalists in badminton
20th-century Singaporean women
21st-century Singaporean women